Emmert is a surname. Notable people with the surname include:

 Chad Emmert (born 1966), American songwriter
 Emil Emmert (1844–1911), who formulated Emmert's law of optics
 František Emmert (born 1974), writer
 František Gregor Emmert (1940–2015), composer of music
 James Emmert (1895–1974), Justice of the Indiana Supreme Court
 Mark Emmert (born 1952), president of the National Collegiate Athletic Association
 Paul Emmert (1826–1867), Swiss-born American artist

See also
Emert, a surname